Elena Ivanivna Nozdran (born 20 July 1975) is a badminton player from Ukraine.She played at the 2005 World Badminton Championships in Anaheim. 

In the women's singles event she reached the second round before losing to Pi Hongyan of France. Nozdran also play in the German leagues, then she moved to Luxembourg and work as a badminton coach. In Luxembourg, she come back to the court as a player again and won the women's doubles national championships in 2011, 2013, 2014, and 2017; and also in the mixed doubles in 2011 and 2017.

Achievements

World Senior Championships

Women’s singles

IBF World Grand Prix
The World Badminton Grand Prix has been sanctioned by the International Badminton Federation since 1983.

Women’s singles

Women's doubles

BWF/IBF International Challenge/Series (4 titles, 2 runners-up) 
Women's singles

Women's doubles

Mixed doubles

  BWF International Challenge tournament
  BWF International Series tournament
  BWF Future Series tournament

References
 European results 
 
 TuS Wiebelskirchen zieht sich nach 36 Jahren aus der Bundesliga zurück
 Luxembourg
 Luxemburgischer Erfolg durch Nozdran
 

Living people
1975 births
Sportspeople from Dnipro
Ukrainian female badminton players
Badminton players at the 1996 Summer Olympics
Badminton players at the 2000 Summer Olympics
Olympic badminton players of Ukraine
Luxembourgian female badminton players